is a Japanese TV show hosted by the members of the group Kanjani8. The show began airing on May 2, 2007, and is broadcast every Wednesday night on Kansai TV from 0:35 AM to 1:30 AM (before April 20, 2011 it was broadcast from 0:35 AM to 1:05 AM ).

Cast
Kanjani8 (hosts) (You Yokoyama, Subaru Shibutani, Shingo Murakami, Ryuhei Maruyama, Shota Yasuda, Ryo Nishikido, Tadayoshi Okura)
Keiko Fujimoto (narrator)
Masato Den (narrator)
Kansai Jr. (Juniben/Junideka/Junimaga section hosts) (Junta Nakama, Akito Kiriyama, Daichi Nakata, Takahiro Hamada)

Broadcasting details

2007

2008

2009

2010

2011

2012

2013

2014

2015

References 

 Kanjani8 no Janiben official website 

Japanese variety television shows
2007 Japanese television series debuts
Kanjani Eight